Rameses Echevarria (born November 3, 1980), who goes by the stage name Cheno Lyfe (Christ Hearted Evangelist Now Offering Lyfe), is an American Christian hip hop musician. He is signed to Good City Music, and together they released Lunar in 2013. This was his breakthrough album on the Billboard charts.

Early life
Cheno Lyfe was born on November 3, 1980 as Rameses Echevarria in Brooklyn, New York, who moved to Miami, Florida as a youngster. He is of Cuban descent, and is a first-generation American, since his mother, Xiomara Echevarria, was born in Cuba. He was arrested and served 5 years in prison in his early twenties.

Personal life
Cheno Lyfe married Lydia Echevarria, which they have four kids, Jadel, Rameses Jr., Levi and Abigail . They reside in Atlanta.

Music career
Cheno Lyfe was signed to Good City Music, and released Lunar on July 23, 2013. This album was his breakthrough release on the Billboard Top Gospel Albums chart. The album was reviewed by Wade-O Radio, and Jam the Hype.

Discography

Studio albums

References

1980 births
Living people
Musicians from Florida
American performers of Christian hip hop music
Rappers from Miami
Rappers from Brooklyn
21st-century American rappers
Musicians from Atlanta